The 1915 Dublin Harbour by-election was held on 1 October 1915.  The by-election was held due to the death of the incumbent Irish Parliamentary Party MP, William Abraham.  It was won by the Irish Parliamentary candidate Alfie Byrne.

References

1915 elections in Ireland
1915 elections in the United Kingdom
By-elections to the Parliament of the United Kingdom in Dublin (city) constituencies